Auguste Baillayre (1879 in Eastern Pyrenees – 1961 in Bucharest) was a painter from France. He was a professor at Ecolle de Belle Arte of Chişinău and the first director of the National Museum of Fine Arts, Chişinău.

Biography
Auguste Baillayre was born in 1879 in France (Eastern Pyrenees) where he spent his childhood and his adolescence in Georgia (1885–1898). He studied then in Amsterdam, St. Petersburg and Grenoble and became an important artistic personality in Chişinău (1918–1943). He was a professor at the Chişinău Art School. Several of his works are kept at the National Museum of Fine Arts, Chişinău, whose first director he was in 1939.

The Post of Moldova issued, on May 1, 2009, its 9th postal stationery cover with a preprinted stamp commemorating the 130th anniversary of Auguste Baillayre. A portrait of the painter appears on the stamp and two of his works, "Still Life with Fish" (1927) and "Self Portrait with Masks" (1945), are also reproduced on the left on the envelope.

His daughter Tatiana also became an artist.

Gallery

References

External links 
 Hommage au peintre Baillayre en Moldavie
 Artistul european Auguste Baillayre, omagiat la Muzeul de Artă din Chişinău

1879 births
1961 deaths
19th-century French painters
French male painters
20th-century French painters
20th-century French male artists
20th-century Romanian male artists
20th-century Romanian painters
Nayanars
19th-century French male artists
19th-century Romanian male artists